Murshidabad is a railway station on the Sealdah-Lalgola line and is located in Murshidabad district in the Indian state of West Bengal. Murshidabad railway station lies in Murshidabad.

History 
Ranaghat–Lalgola branch line was opened in 1905 during British reign.

Electrification 
The 128 km long Krishnanagar–Lalgola stretch was electrified in 2004 for EMU services.

Infrastructure 
The railway station has four platforms after the installation of a double railway track.

Extension 
The bridge named as Nashipur Rail Bridge over the Bhagirathi River was built decade ago. But due to land acquisition problems, the work of connecting these two stations couldn't be completed. The work has resumed again in November, 2022. According to railway officials, Nashipur bridge  is expected to be comissioned by June, 2023. Rail Ministry reports say that this bridge will minimise the travel distance (21 km) as well as time.

Mail/Express trains 
 SDAH-LGL Bhagirathi Express
 KOAA-LGL Hazarduari Express
 KOAA-LGL Dhanodhanya Express

Gallery

References

External links 

Murshidabad Railway Station

Railway stations in Murshidabad district
Sealdah railway division
Kolkata Suburban Railway stations
Murshidabad